The Widow Couderc is a 1971 French drama film based on the 1942 novel of the same name by Georges Simenon.

Plot
In 1934, in a little village on a canal in Burgundy, a laconic young stranger called Jean is walking along the road when an older woman in black gets off a bus with a heavy load. He helps her carry it to her farm, where she offers him work and a room. He accepts, and soon she is in his bed. 
She is the widow Couderc, running the farm single-handed with her infirm father-in-law. Across the canal live her sister-in-law and ineffectual husband, who are trying to evict the widow and gain the property. They have a 16-year-old daughter, Félicie, who has already managed to have a baby, father uncertain.

Jean enjoys helping on the farm, but will reveal little of his past. His father was rich, he says, and he wanted to become a doctor but killed a man, ending up in jail from which he has escaped. The widow accepts his story, but her trust is strained when he can't resist sleeping with the alluring Félicie as well. 
The situation is taken out of her hands when her sister-in-law denounces Jean to the police, who surround the farm at dawn. When Jean fires on them, both he and the widow are killed in the ensuing fusillade.

Cast
 Simone Signoret - Tati Couderc
 Alain Delon - Jean Lavigne
 Ottavia Piccolo - Félicie
 Jean Tissier - Henri Couderc
 Monique Chaumette - Françoise
 Boby Lapointe - Désiré
 Pierre Collet - commissaire Mallet
 François Valorbe - colonel Luc de Mortemont
 Jean-Pierre Castaldi

Reception
The film opened at number one at the box office in Paris with a first week gross of $163,000.

References

External links
 
Review of film at New York Times

1971 drama films
French drama films
Films based on Belgian novels
Films based on works by Georges Simenon
Films directed by Pierre Granier-Deferre
Films scored by Philippe Sarde
1970s French films
1970s French-language films